This table displays the top-rated primetime television series of the 1963–64 season as measured by Nielsen Media Research.

References

1963 in American television
1964 in American television
1963-related lists
1964-related lists
Lists of American television series